Decatur station is a transit station in Decatur, Georgia, on the Blue Line of the Metropolitan Atlanta Rapid Transit Authority (MARTA) rail system. This station opened on June 30, 1979. In 2005, a major renovation of the Church Street entrance to the station was begun that was completed in 2006. The redesign was intended to allow the station to fit in better with the stores and restaurants in the Decatur square. It has 2 tracks and side platforms that serve each track. It is one of the only stations on the Blue Line (besides those located in downtown Atlanta) that is completely underground.

Decatur mainly serves the City of Decatur and South Dekalb County. It provides access to Downtown Decatur-Historic Shopping and Dining District, Atlanta's Dekalb Conventional Visitor's Bureau, Decatur Main Library, Dekalb County Court House, Decatur City Hall, Devry University, Holiday Inn Plaza Decatur and the Emory-Cliff Shuttle.

Bus service is provided at this station to: South Dekalb Mall, North Dekalb Mall, Agnes Scott College, Georgia State University- Decatur, Emory Hospital-Decatur, North Dekalb Health Center, Decatur Main Post Office, Virginia-Highlands and the Atlanta VA Medical Center.

Green Line service, which currently terminates at Edgewood/Candler Park station, is expected to be extended to Avondale with stops at East Lake and Decatur when the platform at Bankhead is expanded to accommodate 8-car trains. This is being done to increase the levels of service on MARTA's east–west trunk line.

Station layout

Buses at this station
The station is served by the following MARTA bus routes:
 Route 15 - Candler Road / South DeKalb
 Route 19 - Clairmont Road
 Route 36 - North Decatur Road / Virginia-Highland
 Route 123 - Church Street / North Dekalb Mall
 Route 823 - Belvedere Plaza / Decatur

Landmarks and surrounding area
Downtown Decatur
 Devry University
Emory-Cliff Shuttle
Agnes Scott College
 Decatur Main Library
 Decatur Historic Courthouse
Dekalb County Courthuse

References

External links 

MARTA Station Page
nycsubway.org Atlanta page
 Station from Google Maps Street View

Blue Line (MARTA)
Metropolitan Atlanta Rapid Transit Authority stations
Railway stations in DeKalb County, Georgia
Railway stations in the United States opened in 1979
Decatur, Georgia
1979 establishments in Georgia (U.S. state)